Gielgud or Giełgud  is a Polish surname, a Polinized form of the Lithuanian noble surname Gelgaudas. Notable people with the surname include:

 John Gielgud (1904–2000), English actor, director, and producer
 Lewis Gielgud (1894–1953), English scholar and intelligence officer
 Maina Gielgud (born 1945), British ballet dancer and ballet administrator
 Val Gielgud (1900–1981), English actor, writer, director and broadcaster

See also
 Gielgud Theatre, London
 39557 Gielgud, an asteroid
 Gielgud Award
 

Polish-language surnames